During the 1995–96 English football season, Queens Park Rangers competed in the FA Premier League.

Season summary
One player never makes a team, but QPR felt the loss of prolific striker Les Ferdinand following his £6 million move to Newcastle United.

The last three seasons had seen QPR finish fifth, ninth and eighth in the Premiership thanks largely to Ferdinand's goals, but the new strike partnership of Kevin Gallen and Danny Dichio failed to provide anywhere near as many goals as QPR had managed while Ferdinand was up front. Even the support of excellent winger Trevor Sinclair could not translate into a strong supply of goals, and it was soon clear that player-manager Ray Wilkins and his men were in for a hard season.

A 3–0 win over London rivals West Ham United in late April was not enough to keep QPR up, and their relegation was confirmed after 13 years in the top flight.

Hopes of QPR gaining a quick return to the Premiership were given a major boost by the confirmation that Gallen, Dichio and Sinclair were to stay at the club.

Kit
View From became QPR's new kit manufacturers. American electronics company Compaq remained as kit sponsors.

Final league table

Results summary

Results by matchday

Results
Queens Park Rangers' score comes first

Legend

FA Premier League

FA Cup

League Cup

Players

First-team squad
Squad at end of season

Left club during season

Reserve squad

Transfers

In

Out

Transfers in:  £4,937,500
Transfers out:  £2,275,000
Total spending:  £2,662,500

Statistics

Starting 11
Considering starts in Premier League and League Cup

Notes

References

Queens Park Rangers F.C. seasons
Queens Park Rangers